Fenton Lake may refer to:

Fenton Lake (Nova Scotia), a lake in Nova Scotia
Fenton Lake State Park in New Mexico
Lake Fenton (disambiguation)
Glacial Fenton Lake was in the eastern basin of Lake Superior during the Wisconsin Ice Age.